Rahni Sadler (Sydney, June 24, 1972), is an Australian television reporter.

Career
Sadler first worked in media as a teen model for Chadwick Model Management. Her career focus though, was journalism.
After doing work experience in radio, TV and at magazines, Rahni secured her first reporting job at WIN TV, the Nine Network's affiliate in Canberra. She chose Australia's capital because she studied politics at Sydney University, taking part in the Government Honours program. Her break as a correspondent in the Federal Parliamentary Press Gallery came in 1997. She nearly missed out on the job because she was sent on an urgent assignment to cover the Thredbo landslide for WIN News on the day of her job interview with the Seven Network. She approached Seven's bureau chief, Glenn Milne, on the side of the Thredbo Mountain and he agreed to reschedule.

Sadler broke many stories as a reporter for the Seven Network at its Federal Political Bureau in Canberra from 1997 to 2000. In mid-2000 she accepted a position at Seven's Sydney newsroom. In 2003 she switched to Network Ten where she became a correspondent at the Los Angeles bureau. The Seven Network lured her back in February 2007, although this time in at Los Angeles bureau. While in the US Rahni covered two Presidential election campaigns, numerous hurricanes including Katrina and Rita, the Academy Awards, the Golden Globes and Screen Actors Guild Awards as well as the Emmys, Grammys and MTV Music Awards. Rahni was among the first journalists on the scene following the tragic news of the death of actor Heath Ledger. She broke the news of Michael Jackson's death to Australian audiences live on radio station 2GB with Jason Morrison on 25 June 2009.

In 2010, she returned to Australia after more than seven years as a correspondent in the U.S. and took up a position as senior reporter for the Seven Network's Sunday Night program. She was also a fill-in presenter on Weekend Sunrise.

Rahni has carved out a reputation as a thorough and empathetic interviewer receiving strong praise for her interviewing style, particularly with celebrities. Rahni has mentioned as among her favourite interview subjects Matt Damon, Bruce Springsteen, Barry Gibb, Cher, Steve Carell, Ricky Gervais, Queen, Fleetwood Mac and Abba.

Sadler is noted for her enthusiastic coverage of the inauguration of U.S. President Barack Obama from Washington in January 2009. She has twice been recognised by the National Press Club in its Health Journalism Awards. In 2012 she was presented with the Victor Chang Award for Excellence in Journalism.

In April 2017, Sadler resigned from a full-time position at Seven but continued to work with the network on a freelance basis.

She is now a producer/reporter at the Australian Broadcasting Corporation.

Personal life
Rahni attended Santa Sabina College in the Sydney suburb of Strathfield, a day school for girls. She completed a Bachelor of Arts degree at Sydney University, participating in the honours program in the Political Science (Government) Department.

She has been a volunteer with the Barnardos charity since 1996.

Sadler is the sister of Matthew Sadler, a TV journalist at Network Ten. Another brother, Vernon Sadler, is a social worker in a remote Aboriginal community. Her maternal grandmother, Joyce Robertson, was editor of the rural New South Wales newspaper The Coonamble Times. 

She has one child, born in 2018.

References 

Australian television journalists
Australian reporters and correspondents
1972 births
Living people